Club Social y Deportivo Lautaro de Buin is a Chilean Football club, their home town is Buin, Chile. They currently play in the third level of Chilean football, the Segunda División.

The club were founded on January 23, 1923 and participated for 3 years in Segunda División Profesional, 14 years in Tercera División A and 11 years in Tercera División B.

Seasons played

3 seasons in Segunda División
14 seasons in Tercera División A
11 seasons in Tercera División B

Current squad

2021 Winter Transfers

In

Out

See also
Chilean football league system

References

External links

1923 establishments in Chile
Association football clubs established in 1923
Football clubs in Chile